Jaime Balmes (1810–1848) was a Spanish Catholic priest known for his political and philosophical writing.

Balmes may also refer to:

 "Balmes (A Better Life)", a 2001 song by German DJ Ian Pooley
 Abraham de Balmes (died 1523), Italian Jewish physician and translator
 José Balmes (1927–2016), Spanish-Chilean painter
 SS Balmes, a Spanish steamship that caught fire in 1913

See also
 Balme, Italy